MJ Department Stores Sdn Bhd is a popular retail company in Malaysia which offers items at a medium-to-high rate. The company opened its first store at Pertama Complex, Kuala Lumpur in September, 1976,with a retail space of 18,305 sq ft (1,705 sq metres). Metrojaya's latest outlet, in Berjaya Times Square closed in December 2009, after only three years of operation. Metrojaya currently has four outlets in Malaysia namely Mid Valley Megamall, Suria Sabah, Permaisuri Imperial City Mall and LaLaport BBCC. 
 
The Metrojaya group currently operates a chain of four department stores and more than 70 specialty stores that occupy over one million square feet of floor space, including Cape Cod, East India Company, Living Quarters, Reject Shop and Somerset Bay.

Retail operations
The company is principally involved in operating departmental stores and investment holding whilst its subsidiary companies are principally involved in property holding, investment holding as well as the operating of specialty stores and general merchandising stores. Metrojaya department stores offer a wide range of merchandise that cater to the needs and tastes of middle and high income groups. The group operates four department stores, one hypermarket store under the Cosmart name at the Bukit Jambul Complex in Penang and one "MJ by Metrojaya" Fashion Concept Store at The Curve in Mutiara Damansara.

The retail operations can be broadly classified as:

 Ladies Department (includes apparel and accessories);
 Gents Department (includes apparel and accessories);
 Juniors Department (for teens and young adults);
 Children Department;
 Homes Department (includes kitchen, bathroom, bedroom, garden);
 Cosmetics and Fragrances.

Department stores
West Malaysia
 Mid Valley Megamall, Kuala Lumpur (190,000 sq ft
 The Curve, Mutiara Damansara (60,000 sq ft) - closed 2021
Brem Mall, Kepong (46,000 sq ft)
Mitsui Shopping Park LaLaport BBCC, Bukit Bintang 

East Malaysia
 Suria Sabah, Kota Kinabalu (125,000 sq ft)
 CityOne Megamall, Kuching (130,000 sq ft) - closed 2019
Permaisuri Imperial City Mall, Miri
AEON Mall Kuching Central, Kuching

MJ Outlet
West Malaysia
 Ampang Point Shopping Centre, Ampang
Mitsui Outlet Park KLIA Sepang, Sepang

References

External links
Metrojaya Berhad (MYX: 4987), bursamalaysia.com
Company Overview of Metrojaya Berhad, bloomberg.com

1974 establishments in Malaysia
Department stores of Malaysia
Companies based in Kuala Lumpur
Companies formerly listed on Bursa Malaysia
Privately held companies of Malaysia
Malaysian companies established in 1974
Retail companies established in 1974